Sketches in Rhythm is a 33-RPM LP album by Venezuelan composer/arranger/conductor Aldemaro Romero, released in 1958, under contract with RCA Victor. 
Performed by Aldemaro Romero and his dance orchestra.

Track listing

1958 albums
Aldemaro Romero albums
RCA Records albums